Radès is a harbour city in Ben Arous Governorate, Tunisia.

Rades is divided into sub cities: Radès Medina, Radès Méliane, Rades Forêt, Chouchet Radès, El Malleha, Noubou and The Olympic City, Rades Montjil, Rades echat. Way to Zahra district and el Oulija.

History
Maxula Prates was a Civitas (town) of the Roman Province of Africa.

From the beginning of the Muslim conquest of the Maghreb, the hill of Rades was equipped with a ribat. It is around this ribat, which has long since disappeared, that the village of which it is spoken in the 11th century was built and which seems to have been provided with a port since that time.
Under the Hafsides, vineyards spread over the hillsides.

During the reign of the Husseinite beys, Radès was inhabited by farmers and sought by the notables of Tunis city. The locality then grew rapidly and extended to the beach and the surrounding hills during the 19th century. High dignitaries built houses such as houses in a Hispano-Arabic style decorated with gardens such as those of governor Mokhtar Ben Zid and brigadier general Allala Ben Frija, who built a house there in 1862.

Between the end of the 19th and the beginning of the 20th century, members of the Djellouli family built themselves beautiful houses of Hispano-Arabic style, notably the ministers M'hammed Djellouli and Taïeb Djellouli, as well as the Governor Sadok Djellouli. French residents also built bourgeois villas in Europe.  One can quote the colonial villa built in 1905 and bought by the Grand Vizier M'hamed Chenik, which gives it Hispano-Moorish and Italian styles; His brother Hassen, a notable landowner, lived in the villa Vacherot, which became his residence in the middle of the 20th century.

Name
The modern name of the town, Radès, derives from the Latin expression "Maxula per races" (Maxula by the ferries), Maxula being the original Libyco-Berber name of the village near which is in the Antiquity a station of boats whose function is To connect the terminus of the coastal road with Carthage by sea.  The Arabs have retained from this toponymic designation only spleens which they have transformed into Rades.

Bishopric
During the Roman Empire the town was also the seat of an ancient Christian bishopric which survives today as a titular see of the Roman Catholic Church.

Sports
Despite its small population, the city is internationally known for its sports facilities. Radès hosted the 2015 FIBA Africa Championship, which was played in the 17,000-seat Salle Omnisport de Rades. The Tunisia national football team plays matches at the 65,000-capacity National Stadium of Rades.

The city has an internationally recognized club team: Étoile Sportive de Radès.

Tramway
The Maxula-Radès tramway to the sea was tram line that ran between Maxula-Radès station and the Mediterranean coast from 1902 and until the 1920s. The Beylical Decree of 7 July 1902 approved the agreement signed on 23 June of the same year between the Director of Public Works and Mr. Gaudens-Ravotti (industrial and public works contractor) for the construction and operation of a line of Tramway The track was built with a width of sixty centimeters and animal traction was used.  The line ran along Boulevard Massicault and has a length of two kilometers.

References

External links

 
Populated places in Ben Arous Governorate
Communes of Tunisia
Mediterranean port cities and towns in Tunisia
Catholic titular sees in Africa